Midwestcon is a science fiction convention held annually in the Cincinnati, Ohio area by the Cincinnati Fantasy Group.

Midwestcon is an informal type of convention known as a "relaxacon," which means that it has no programming.  Instead it is notable as a means for science fiction fans to get together and talk to each other without the distractions of other conventions.

History

The 1949 Worldcon took place in Cincinnati, and the first Midwestcon followed in 1950, and has been held every year since, making it the second longest-running SF convention to be held in the same city, and the third oldest in the U.S.

Many significant figures in science fiction have attended Midwestcon, including Isaac Asimov and Arthur C. Clarke. Wilson Tucker served as the perennial toastmaster for many years. Other notable Midwestcon attendees have included:
 Robert Bloch
 Jack L. Chalker
 Robert Coulson
 Harlan Ellison
 Phyllis Eisenstein
 Lloyd Arthur Eshbach
 Philip Jose Farmer
 Randall Garrett
 Joe Haldeman
 David H. Keller
 Stephen Leigh
 George R.R. Martin
 Bea Mahaffey
 Julian May
 Andrew J. Offutt
 Alexei Panshin
 Mike Resnick
 Frank M. Robinson
 Dick Smith
 E. E. "Doc" Smith
 Ted White

Howard DeVore and Margaret Ford Keifer attended all 56 Midwestcons held from 1950 to 2005.

First Fandom was founded at the 1959 Midwestcon.

External links
Official site
Asimov attending Midwestcon
Arthur C. Clarke attending Midwestcon

References

Science fiction conventions in the United States